The High Point Panthers men's soccer team is the soccer team that represents High Point University in High Point, North Carolina. The school's team currently competes in the Big South Conference.

Coaches
High Point has had eight head coaches for its soccer program.
 Edgar Hartley (1929)
 Unknown (1930–1941)
 No team (1942–1970)
 Chuck Hartman (1971)
 Ray Alley (1972–74)
 Ken Chartier (1975–77)
 Woody Gibson (1978–97)
 Peter Broadley (1998–2006)
 Dustin Fonder (2007–14)
 EJ O’Keeffe (2015–2018)
 Zach Haines (2019–present)

Seasons

References

External links
 

 
1929 establishments in North Carolina
1942 disestablishments in North Carolina
1971 establishments in North Carolina
Association football clubs established in 1929